Eupithecia albimontanata is a moth in the  family Geometridae. It is found in North America, including Arizona, California, Colorado and Utah.

The wingspan is about 19 mm.

References

Moths described in 1949
albimontanata
Moths of North America